Allium dichlamydeum is a species of wild onion known by the common name coastal onion. It is endemic to California where it grows on sea cliffs and hills overlooking the ocean, from Santa Barbara County to Mendocino County.

Description
Allium dichlamydeum grows from a brown or gray bulb 1.0-1.5 cm wide. It has a stout naked green stem surrounded by 3-6 long onion leaves. Atop the thick stem is an inflorescence of 5-30 flowers. Each flower has six oval-shaped dull-pointed tepals in shades of bright magenta to fuchsia and each flower is about a centimeter wide.

References

dichlamydeum
Endemic flora of California
Natural history of the California chaparral and woodlands
Plants described in 1888
Taxa named by Edward Lee Greene
Onions